The 1937 FA Cup final was contested by Sunderland and Preston North End at Wembley. Sunderland won 3–1, with goals by Bobby Gurney, Raich Carter and Eddie Burbanks. Frank O'Donnell's strike on 44 minutes had put Preston ahead.  It was the first final tie contested in May (all previous finals had hitherto been played in April).

The last survivor from the winning side was Sunderland goalkeeper Johnny Mapson, who died in August 1999 at the age of 82. The last surviving player from the game, Preston's Jimmy Dougal, died two months later at the age of 86.

Match details

Match rules
90 minutes.
30 minutes of extra-time if necessary.
Replay if scores still level.

External links
 Match report at www.fa-cupfinals.co.uk
FA Cup Final lineups

FA Cup Finals
FA Cup Final
FA Cup Final 1937
FA Cup Final 1937
FA Cup Final
FA Cup Final